Openismus was a small company with limited liability, based in Berlin and Munich, with a focus on Open Source technologies. It is known for contributions to the GNOME project (through gtkmm, GTK+ and Glade) and to the Maemo and MeeGo platforms, as well as co-founding the GNOME Mobile & Embedded Initiative. The company closed down in March 2014.

Projects maintained by Openismus 
 gtkmm, C++ bindings for the GTK+ library
 Glom, a database manager
 Maliit, an input method framework that supports Wayland
 Rygel, an UPnP/DLNA media server for GNOME

References

External links 
 Openismus website
 Blogs from developers of Openismus

Companies established in 2006
Free software companies
GNOME companies
Linux companies
Software companies of Germany
Companies based in Berlin